The events of 6 October were a general strike, armed insurgency and declaration of a Catalan State by Catalonia's autonomous government on 6 October 1934, in reaction to the inclusion of conservatives in the republican regime of Spain. They took place as part of a nationwide strike and armed action known as the Revolution of 1934. Catalan President Lluís Companys declared the Catalan State at 8p.m. Martial law was declared, and military forces attacked the Palau de la Generalitat de Catalunya (Palace of the Government of Catalonia) and other buildings. Companys surrendered on the morning of 7 October.

Background

In Spain
In the general election of 1933, left-wing parties lost heavily, and the newly formed conservative Confederación Española de Derechas Autónomas (Confederation of the Autonomous Right; CEDA), led by José María Gil Robles, became the largest party with 115 seats. Nevertheless, incoming prime minister Alejandro Lerroux formed a government which excluded CEDA and was dominated by Lerroux's Partido Republicano Radical (Radical Republican Party). Lerroux resigned in April 1934, to be replaced by Ricardo Samper. A summer of strikes and social conflict led Gil Robles to withdraw CEDA support from the Samper government and demand participation in government. President Niceto Alcalá Zamora, unwilling to call new elections, instructed Lerroux to form a new government. The government was announced on 4 October 1934 and included three CEDA members. Left wing republicans denounced the "betrayal" of the Republic. The Unión General de Trabajadores (General Union of Workers; UGT) called a general strike.

The general strike began on 5 October, in places across Spain including Madrid, Seville, Córdoba and Zaragoza. There was fighting in some places, including Mondragón and Eibar in the Basque Country. There were also clashes in Madrid, but in general, planned uprisings failed to materialise or were quickly put down, and members of the military and of the Guardia Civil did not, as hoped, join the rebels. Outside of Catalonia, the only significant military action took place in Asturias where, in the early hours of 6 October, activists took hold of Avilés, Gijón and the centre of Oviedo, as well as Guardia Civil barracks in mining areas, beginning the Asturian miners' strike of 1934 and the "October Revolution".

In Catalonia
Following the establishment of the Second Spanish Republic in 1931, a Statute of Autonomy established Catalonia as an autonomous region, but it was passed only after two important cuts that kept control of taxation and education vested in the Spanish state. Elections were held in November 1932 to a new Catalan parliament, which were won by the Esquerra Republicana de Catalunya (Republican Left of Catalonia; ERC), with Francesc Macià becoming president.

Macià died at Christmas, and Lluís Companys was elected president of Catalonia a week later on 1 January 1934. The ERC won the Catalan election of 1934, bucking the trend in Spain where a shift to the right was the norm. The implementation of the Statute of Autonomy was seen to be threatened by the CEDA success in the 1933 election and its entry into government on 4 October 1934.

6 October

The general strike in Catalonia was organised by the Alianza Obrera, working alongside the Escamots (squads), a paramilitary adjunct to the ERC. The Catalan minister of security, Josep Dencàs, in theory had 70,000 armed Escamots at his disposal, but in the event they were ill-prepared for the fighting. The president, Lluís Companys, was thought to be having talks with former Spanish prime minister Manuel Azaña, who had gone to Barcelona, with a view to declaring the government deposed and creating a provisional government of a federal Spanish republic in Barcelona. In fact, Azaña met with the Catalan committee of his Izquierda Republicana (Republican Left) party and it was agreed to oppose any such action. He then left his hotel and stayed with a friend. Companys telephoned Domènec Batet, the military commander of Barcelona, to ask him to put his forces at the disposal of the new republic. Batet was non-committal.

At 8p.m., Companys appeared on a balcony of the Palau de la Generalitat (Government Building) to proclaim the "Catalan State within the Spanish Federal Republic". He told the crowd that "monarchists and fascists" had "assaulted the government", and went on:
In this solemn hour, in the name of the people and the Parliament, the Government over which I preside assumes all the faculties of power in Catalonia, proclaims the Catalan State of the Spanish Federal Republic, and in establishing and fortifying relations with the leaders of the general protest against Fascism, invites them to establish in Catalonia the provisional Government of the Republic, which will find in our Catalan people the most generous impulse of fraternity in the common desire to erect a liberal and magnificent federal republic.
An hour later, General Batet declared martial law. He moved against trade union and militia headquarters, both of whom surrendered quickly, then brought light artillery to bear against the city hall and the Generalitat. Fighting continued until 6am, when Companys surrendered.

Consequences
Companys and his government were arrested. So too was Manuel Azaña, despite his having taken no part in the events; he was released in December. The Statute of Autonomy was suspended indefinitely on 14 December, and all powers that had been transferred to Barcelona were returned to Madrid. In June 1935, Companys was sentenced to thirty years in prison. Following the Spanish general election of 1936, the new government of Manuel Azaña released Companys and his government from jail.

References

History of Catalonia
1934 in Spain
Catalan independence movement
Conflicts in 1934
1934 in Catalonia